The  Little League World Series took place August 20 to August 26 in Williamsport, Pennsylvania. The Sierra Maestra Little League of Maracaibo, Venezuela defeated Bellaire Little League of Bellaire, Texas in the championship game of the 54th Little League World Series.

Qualification

Pool play
After three U.S. teams finished pool play with a 2–1 record, the team that had allowed the fewest runs per innings played (Bellaire) was declared the pool winner; Davenport was then named pool runner-up due to their win over Vancouver in head-to-head play.

Standings

Game results

Elimination round

Notable players
 Julian Vandervelde (Davenport, Iowa) NFL player Philadelphia Eagles

References

External links
2000 official results via Wayback Machine

Little League World Series
Little League World Series
Little League World Series